Chen Junwu (born March 17, 1927) is a Chinese engineer and an academician of the Chinese Academy of Sciences (CAS).

Biography
Chen was born in Beijing, on March 17, 1927, while his ancestral home in Fuzhou, Fujian. His father  was a politician in late Qing dynasty and early Republic of China. He is the younger brother of Chen Shunyao ( the wife of Song Ping ) and brother in law of Song Ping. He attended Chongde Middle School (now Beijing No.31 High School). In 1944 he was accepted to Peking University, majoring in the Department of Applied Chemistry, where he graduated in 1948.  

In December 1949 he became a technician at a petroleum plant in Fushun, northeast China's Liaoning province. In 1956 he joined the Fushun Design Institute of the Ministry of Petroleum Industry. Three years later, he was appointed an architect at Datong Coal Refinery Plant. Then he joined Luoyang Engineering Company. In 1982 he joined Sinopec.

In 2018, Chen Junwu's biography was published, written by Zhang Wenxin (张文欣), a well known Luoyang-based author. While he's absent to attend the funeral of his elder sister Chen Shunyao on August 3. 2019.

Personal life
Chen married Wu Ningfang and the couple has two daughters, Chen Ling and Chen Xin.

Honours and awards
 1985 National Labor Medal
 1985 State Science and Technology Progress Award (First Class)
 November 1991 Member of the Chinese Academy of Sciences (CAS) 
 1995 Science and Technology Progress Award of the Ho Leung Ho Lee Foundation 
 2015 State Technological Invention Award (First Class)

References

1927 births
Living people
Chemists from Beijing
Engineers from Beijing
National University of Peking alumni
Members of the Chinese Academy of Engineering